The first International Prague Chess Tournament was held in honour of the sixtieth anniversary of Franz Joseph I of Austria's elevation as monarch to the Austria-Hungary Empire. Twenty great masters played in the pavilion of the Chamber of Commerce and Trade in Prague, from May 17 to June 13, 1908.

The representative of the executive board of the Jubilee Exhibition, president L. Bondy greeted tournament competitors and numerous guests in Czech, German, French and English. J. Krautstengl and Dr. G. Bergmann spoke for the presidium of the committee and they expressed their gratitude to the executive board for organizing tournaments. Official organizers were H. Pollak and K. Anderle, whereas referees Karel Traxler and Viktor Tietz had decided to whom two prices for the best games, of 200 and 300 Crowns, will be given. The money was donated by Baron Albert Salomon von Rothschild. The umpire was Dr. A. Klir.

Master Tournament

The results and standings:

Main Tournament
Competitors of the main tournament were selected into four groups, consisting of 8 or 7 players.

The final results:

1. Karel Treybal 

2-3. István Abonyi 

2-3. Ferenc Chalupetzky 

4. Lev Taussig 

5. Josef Dobiáš 

6. Zsigmond Barász 

7. Viktor Dyk 

8-9. Julius Brach  Moravia

8-9. Kamil Krofta 

10. Bernhard Kagan 

11. Jaroslav Engler 

12. František Batík

References

Sport in the Kingdom of Bohemia
Sports competitions in Prague
Chess competitions
Chess in Czechoslovakia
1908 in chess
1900s in Prague
1908 in Austria-Hungary
May 1908 sports events
June 1908 sports events